Naila Jaffri was a Pakistani actress and director. She was known for her roles in dramas Woh, Ek Kasak Reh Gayi, Mausam, Anaya Tumhari Hui and Tera Mera Rishta.

Early life
Naila was born in 1965 on January 27 in Islamabad, Pakistan. She completed her studies from University of Rawalpindi.

Career
Naila started acting on PTV in 1980s and she also did theatre. Naila was noted for her roles in dramas Ek Mohabat Sau Afsaney, Sanam Gazida, Mujh ko Satana, Desi Girls and Thodi Si Khushiyan. After that she also appeared in dramas Don't Jealous, Noorpur Ki Rani, Lamha Lamha Zindagi, Zeenat Bint-e-Sakina Hazir Ho and Sanjha. Since then she appeared in dramas Surkh Jorra, Tera Mera Rishta, Aks, Anaya Tumhari Hui, Mausam, Ghalti, Marasim and Ek Kasak Reh Gayi.

Personal life
Naila was married but after sometime they divorced.

Illness and death
Naila was a cancer survivor, and had had ovarian cancer. She died from cancer. She died on July 17, 2021, at age 56, funeral was held in Tooba Mosque in DHA Phase 2 on Saturday and was laid to rest in at the Army graveyard near Kalapul.

Filmography

Television

Web series

Telefilm

Film

References

External links
 

1965 births
20th-century Pakistani actresses
Pakistani television directors
Pakistani film actresses
21st-century Pakistani actresses
Women television directors
2021 deaths
Pakistani television actresses